"Saginaw, Michigan" is a 1964 song performed by Lefty Frizzell.  The single was Lefty Frizzell's sixth and final number one on the U.S. country chart.  "Saginaw, Michigan" spent a total of 23 weeks on the country chart and peaked at number 85 on the Billboard Hot 100.  The song earned Lefty Frizzell a Grammy Award nomination.

Synopsis
The song is sung from the point of view of the working-class son of a fisherman from the titular city of Saginaw, Michigan, who falls in love with the daughter of a much wealthier man. The rich man does not believe the singer is worthy of his daughter, so the singer travels north to Alaska in hopes of finding gold. When there is no gold, the singer concocts a ruse and returns to Saginaw: he tells the wealthy man that he had struck a huge amount of gold and sells the worthless plot to the rich man for him to develop.

The song ends with the bamboozled rich man searching in vain for the gold in Alaska, while his daughter gladly accepts the singer's hand in marriage.

Chart performance

Cover versions
The most notable cover of the song was done by Bobby Bare. It was included on his 1966 LP, The Streets of Baltimore.  
The song was also recorded by John Prine and Mac Wiseman for their 2007 CD, Standard Songs for Average People.
Randy Travis included a cover version on his 2013 CD Influence Vol. 1: The Man I Am

References

1964 songs
Lefty Frizzell songs
Songs written by Bill Anderson (singer)
Saginaw, Michigan
Songs written by Don Wayne (songwriter)
Song recordings produced by Don Law